State Highway 119 (SH 119) is a state highway in the U.S. state of Texas that runs from Stockdale to Alt. US 77 and U.S. Highway 183 north of Goliad.

Route description
SH 119 begins at an intersection with U.S. Route 87 and State Highway 97 just southeast of the city of Stockdale.  It travels southeast through farm and ranchland before reaching Yorktown.  The route continues southeast, passing through the unincorporated town of Weesatche before reaching its southern terminus at an intersection with U.S. Route 183 and U.S. Route 77 Alternate, about 9 miles north of Goliad.

History
The route was originally proposed on August 24, 1925 from Stockdale to Goliad. Construction started on December 21, 1926, and the highway was officially numbered 119. On January 16, 1928, the section north of Yorktown was cancelled. On February 24, 1930, it extended south to Goliad State Park. The route was completed by 1933, and on June 5, 1933 was proposed to be extended southward to Refugio. On March 19, 1934, the section from Weesatche south to Goliad, along with the extension south to Refugio, was transferred to SH 29, which was being extended southward from Cuero. On August 1, 1936, SH 119 was extended north to SH 112 (this section of SH 112 became part of SH 80 on September 22, 1936; restoring part of the section deleted on January 16, 1928). On August 1, 1946, SH 119 was extended north to Stockdale (restoring the section deleted on January 16, 1928), completing its current route.

Counties and junctions

References

119
Transportation in Wilson County, Texas
Transportation in Karnes County, Texas
Transportation in DeWitt County, Texas
Transportation in Goliad County, Texas